Tambovsky is a rural locality (a settlement) and the administrative center of Tambovsky Selsoviet, Romanovsky District, Altai Krai, Russia. The population was 808 as of 2013. There are 11 streets.

Geography 
Tambovsky is located 29 km northwest of Romanovo (the district's administrative centre) by road. Dubrovino and Zakladnoye are the nearest rural localities.

References 

Rural localities in Romanovsky District, Altai Krai